"Rubber Ball" is a 1961 song by Bobby Vee.

Rubber Ball may also refer to:

Bouncy ball, toy
 "Rubber Ball", a song by Cage The Elephant from Thank You Happy Birthday
 "Rubber Ballz", a song by The Shins from Heartworms

See also
"Red Rubber Ball, a 1966 song first performed by The Cyrcle